Garður is a former municipality and town located in southwestern Iceland, bordered by the Faxaflói Bay on the Southern Peninsula. In 2018 it merged with Sandgerði to create the new municipality of Suðurnesjabær.

The town Garður, which means garden or yard, was named after one of the many earthen walls once erected on the boundaries between local properties. Garður was mentioned in the Book of Settlement when Ingólfur Arnarson, the first settler in Iceland, gave his cousin Steinunn Gamla this area of land.

Overview

The rich fishing grounds by the shore remain the town's economic base. A great deal of fishing was carried out here in earlier centuries, and there are relics to be found along the shore. Garður remains a strong fishing center with fish processing firms.

The Garður Peninsula Historical Museum, which is located at the peninsula, tells the story of the fishermen and the history of the people who lived and worked in the community.

Garður is also known for its lighthouses. The old Garðskagi Lighthouse  was built in 1897 and was used until recently as a centre for studying the thousands of migrating birds which arrive there from Greenland and North America every year to breed on the surrounding shore. Today there is a restaurant located here, known as The Old Lighthouse Cafe/Rostin Restaurant which serves a small menu of meals. A new one was built in 1944.

Sports
The local sports club is called Víðir. Their football team played the 2011 season in the men's third division. They last played in Iceland's top tier in 1991.

References

External links
Official website 
 More information and photos about Garður on Hit Iceland

Municipalities of Iceland
Populated places in Southern Peninsula (Iceland)
Reykjanes
Populated places disestablished in 2018